Pseudothestus is a monotypic beetle genus in the family Cerambycidae described by Stephan von Breuning in 1943. Its only species, Pseudothestus niveovittatus, was described by Per Olof Christopher Aurivillius in 1910.

References

Lamiini
Beetles described in 1910
Monotypic beetle genera